Wunna Dam, is an earthfill dam on Wunna river near Nagpur in the state of Maharashtra in India.

Specifications

Purpose
 Irrigation

See also
 Dams in Maharashtra
 List of reservoirs and dams in India

References

Dams in Maharashtra
Dams completed in 1966
1966 establishments in Maharashtra
20th-century architecture in India